The λ (lambda) universality class is a group in condensed matter physics. It regroups several systems possessing strong analogies, namely, superfluids, superconductors and smectics (liquid crystals). All these systems are expected to belong to the same universality class for the thermodynamic critical properties of the phase transition.  While these systems are quite different at the first glance, they all are described by similar formalisms and their typical phase diagrams are identical.

See also 
 Superfluid
 Superconductor
 Liquid crystal
 Phase transition
 Renormalization group
 Topological defect

References

Books 

 Chaikin P. M. and Lubensky T. C. Principles of Condensed Matter Physics (Cambridge University Press, Cambridge) 1995, sect.9.
 Feynman R. P. Progress in Low Temperature Physics Vol.1, edited by C. Gorter (North Holland, Amsterdam) 1955.

Journal articles 

 
 
 
 
 
 
  Translated as: 
 

Condensed matter physics
Critical phenomena
Phase transitions
Phases of matter